Kanarang (also Romanized as Kanārang and Konār Nag) is a village in Qaen Rural District, in the Central District of Qaen County, South Khorasan Province, Iran. At the 2006 census, its population was 107, in 31 families.

References 

Populated places in Qaen County